Legacy of Fire is a band of industrial black metal with existential and mediatic thematic, founded in Colombia in 2002. His philosophical and aesthetic principles adhere to the criticism of the Postmodernism and analysis of the Misanthropy. Its name represents an analogy on the historical consciousness in his artistic thought, expressed with the fire as an element of combustion and natural force.

History 

Legacy of Fire was founded in the city of Santiago de Cali (Colombia) under the name Legado de Fuego, in 2002. After leaving mark on stages and festivals both in Santiago de Cali and surrounding cities in 2005, drummer and founder, Juan Carlos Vasquez, change his address to the city of Bogota (Colombia) to select an alineation of appropriate members to continue the project at this juncture. The process of nearly 3-year left as a final alignment Jaime Coy (Vocals), Camilo Barbosa (guitar), Miguel Nova (Bass), Daniel Pinzón (keyboards and samples) and Juan Carlos Vasquez (drums). Once fully formed, Legacy of Fire shares the stage with representative bands of the international and national scene, taking the opportunity to bring their music to many cities in the Colombian geography. After two albums in demo format, their first full-length "The Circus of the Unfortunate" sees the light in 2008, accompanied by positive reviews a rapid sold-out of the first run of production.

Tour Of The Unfortunate 2009

Legacy of Fire signed a contract with the agency Storm Blaze Entertainment, with whom in order to transport South American achievements in Colombia with "The Circus of the Unfortunate", planned and carried out the promotional tour "Tour of the Unfortunate / South America 2009". Three-month long, March, April and June 2009; scenarios of Colombia, Ecuador, Peru, Bolivia, Argentina and Chile were visited  accompanied by an extensive coverage by the mass-media and specialized press, radio and television, further sold-out of the new special edition of "The Circus of the Unfortunate" for South American tour. Additionally, Legacy of Fire in conjunction with the production company Abysmo - And with the director Carlos Toro (Lacrimosa, Vader, Mercenary, Kreator) - Decides in Santiago de Chile to record the video for the song "Revolución Ausente"  which is the first single from the second full-length album of the group. Legacy of Fire is supported by Spiral Direct Ltd., manufacturer of licensed gothic clothes located in Croydon, Surrey (UK) 

In 2010 EP "Nexus" was distributed for free via Myspace. Thanks to that EP, the band signed a contract with British label Casket Music. For two years, Casket Music will be responsible for promotion and international distribution of "Acid Fate", the second full-length of Legacy of Fire, planned to release early 2011. The band nowadays established in Bogotá, Colombia and is supported by many national and international companies

Thematic 

The rotating axis on which themes are based, are reflections on the social implications of the phenomena that brings postmodernism, with consumerism as the main control mechanism and method of handling the current economic and political order, which they propose leads a systematic self-destruction of civilization. They use topics such as technology, speed and obsession with human dormancy compared to the sharp decline of the race. On the other hand, the word fire, has the mystical connotations of eternity; representative of the natural force, which is taken into account to be reflected in the compositions. From a skeptic and rationalist nature, they don't speak of gods, demons, goblins, warriors, elves, fairies, or any kind of mythological figure. These approaches have similarities with those of thinkers like Arthur Schopenhauer, Jean Baudrillard, Paul Virilio, Karl Marx, among others.

Members 
Jaime Andres Coy - vocals
Miguel Nova - bass
Camilo Barbosa - guitars
Daniel Pinzón - synthesizers
Juan Carlos Vasquez - drums

Discography

Videography

References

External links 
 Legacy of Fire in Myspace
 Legacy of Fire in Shock.com.co
  Legacy of Fire Factor Metal(Spanish)
 Legacy of Fire en Rockombia Primer Video (Spanish)
  Legacy of Fire Rockombia.org Gira Suramericana
  Video Revolucion Ausente - Legacy of Fire 
  Canal Youtube- Legacy of Fire 

Colombian black metal musical groups
Industrial metal musical groups
Musical quintets